Mirsad Türkcan (born Mirsad Jahović, ; on June 7, 1976) is a Turkish former professional basketball player of Bosniak origin. A three-time All-EuroLeague Team member, he is also the fifth best rebounder in the EuroLeague, since the year 2000, with 1,287 total rebounds.

Born in Novi Pazar, SR Serbia, he moved to play basketball in Turkey. At the same time, he also obtained Turkish citizenship, and started playing international basketball with the senior Turkish national team. In 1999, he became the first Turkish basketball player to play in the National Basketball Association (NBA).

In the EuroLeague, Türkcan amassed total of 50 double doubles, and is one of only three players since the year 2000, to record a 20-point, 20-rebound game (27 points and 23 rebounds). He led the EuroLeague in rebounding five times. He was nominated for the EuroLeague 2001–10 All-Decade Team, but he did not make the final list. He became a EuroLeague Legend in 2017.

Professional career

Early years
Türkcan grew up with Efes Pilsen's junior teams, and he made his professional debut with the Efes Pilsen senior men's team, during the 1994–95 season. He won two Turkish Super League championships, in the 1995–96 and 1996–97 seasons with Efes.

NBA
Türkcan was selected by the Houston Rockets in the 1998 NBA Draft. A few days after the draft night, he said in an interview: "This is a big step for me, but I played in Turkey, and I am the first Turkish player to come into the NBA. This is very important for me, for my family, and for my country." Because of the 1998–99 NBA lockout, he returned to Istanbul, continuing to play for Efes Pilsen. Later, his rights were traded to the Philadelphia 76ers, in January 1999, and then to the New York Knicks, in March. He eventually signed with the Knicks, and debuted in the 1999–00 season, in which he played in only 7 games. After being waived in February 2000, he finished his NBA adventure by playing 10 games for the Milwaukee Bucks.

Return to Europe
In January 2001, Türkcan moved to France, signing for the remainder of the season with Paris Basket Racing. He then signed a contract with the Russian club CSKA Moscow, for the 2001–02 season. He signed a contract with the Italian club Montepaschi Siena, for the 2002–03 season. He moved back to Russia for the 2003–04 season, being again signed by CSKA Moscow. Türkcan then played with Dynamo Moscow of the Russian Championship, in the 2004–05 season.

In the summer of 2006, he signed a contract with the Turkish team Fenerbahçe. During the EuroLeague 2008–09 season, he became the first basketball player to amass at least 1,000 total rebounds in the EuroLeague, since the start of the 2000–01 season. In the summer of 2009, he extended his contract with the Turkish club for the next two seasons. In February 2011, Türkcan ruptured the anterior cruciate ligaments in his left knee, during the Turkish Cup final, and because of that, he missed the rest of the season.

In July 2012, it was reported that Türkcan would announce his retirement, after 19 years of playing professional basketball. Türkcan ended his playing career with a farewell exhibition game, in September 2012.

Career statistics

EuroLeague

|-
| style="text-align:left;"| 2001–02
| style="text-align:left;"| CSKA Moscow
| 17 || 15 || 33.6 || .517 || .333 || .709 || style="background:#CFECEC;"| 12.8 || 2.1 || 1.2 || 1.2 || 17.6 || style="background:#CFECEC;"| 25.8
|-
| style="text-align:left;"| 2002–03
| style="text-align:left;"| Montepaschi
| 21 || 21 || 35.6 || .520 || .473 || .707 || style="background:#CFECEC;"| 11.8 || 2.1 || 2.1 || .8 || 14.6 || style="background:#CFECEC;"| 24.0
|-
| style="text-align:left;"| 2003–04
| style="text-align:left;"| CSKA Moscow
| 20 || 18 || 25.6 || .443 || .245 || .681 || 10.4 || 1.1 || .8 || .3 || 9.9 || 17.4
|-
| style="text-align:left;"| 2005–06
| style="text-align:left;"| Ülkerspor
| 16 || 11 || 29.7 || .451 || .320 || .768 || style="background:#CFECEC;"| 8.9 || 1.5 || 1.4 || .5 || 11.7 || 17.3
|-
| style="text-align:left;"| 2006–07
| style="text-align:left;"| Fenerbahçe
| 11 || 10 || 25.9 || .419 || .231 || .750 || 9.2 || 1.1 || 1.2 || .6 || 8.1 || 14.5
|-
| style="text-align:left;"| 2007–08
| style="text-align:left;"| Fenerbahçe
| 12 || 7 || 27.2 || .436 || .241 || .793 || 9.2 || 1.3 || .6 || .8 || 9.8 || 14.7
|-
| style="text-align:left;"| 2008–09
| style="text-align:left;"| Fenerbahçe
| 14 || 11 || 27.4 || .489 || .513 || .833 || style="background:#CFECEC;"| 8.6 || 1.1 || .6 || .4 || 15.4 || 19.4
|-
| style="text-align:left;"| 2009–10
| style="text-align:left;"| Fenerbahçe
| 1 || 0 || 10.3 || .250 || .000 || .000 || 2.0 || .0 || .0 || .0 || 2.0 || .0
|-
| style="text-align:left;"| 2010–11
| style="text-align:left;"| Fenerbahçe
| 12 || 0 || 21.0 || .474 || .361 || .400 || style="background:#CFECEC;"| 7.3 || .8 || .8 || .2 || 7.9 || 11.8
|-
| style="text-align:left;"| 2011–12
| style="text-align:left;"| Fenerbahçe
| 5 || 0 || 16.8 || .316 || .200 || 1.000 || 9.6 || 1.0 || .4 || .0 || 3.4 || 9.6
|- class="sortbottom"
| style="text-align:left;"| Career
| style="text-align:left;"|
| 129 || 93 || 28.3 || .474 || .345 || .726 || 10.0 || 1.4 || 1.1 || .6 || 11.8 || 18.3

NBA

Regular season

|-
| style="text-align:left;"| 1999–00
| style="text-align:left;"| New York
| 7 || 0 || 3.6 || .200 || .000 || .000 || 1.4 || .1 || .3 || .0 || .6
|-
| style="text-align:left;"| 1999–00
| style="text-align:left;"| Milwaukee
| 10 || 0 || 6.5 || .429 || .000 || .625 || 2.3 || .4 || .1 || .1 || 2.9
|-
| style="text-align:left;"| Career
| style="text-align:left;"| 
| 17 || 0 || 5.3 || .368 || .000 || .625 || 1.9 || .3 || .2 || .1 || 1.9

Playoffs

|-
| style="text-align:left;"| 1999–00
| style="text-align:left;"| Milwaukee
| 2 || 0 || 5.0 || .200 || .000 || 1.000 || 1.0 || .0 || .0 || .0 || 2.0
|-
| style="text-align:left;"| Career
| style="text-align:left;"| 
| 2 || 0 || 5.0 || .200 || .000 || 1.000 || 1.0 || .0 || .0 || .0 || 2.0

National team career
Türkcan was a member of the senior Turkish national team that won the silver medal at the EuroBasket 2001. He also played with Turkey's senior national team at the following major international tournaments: the EuroBasket 1995, the EuroBasket 1997, the EuroBasket 1999, the 2002 FIBA World Championship, the EuroBasket 2003, and the EuroBasket 2005.

Personal life
Mirsad Jahović was born in Novi Pazar, Serbia to Bosniak parents. He is known for various philanthropic and humanitarian activities in his hometown. His sister, Emina Jahović, is a pop singer, and the former wife of singer Mustafa Sandal. Türkcan is known to have financially helped jump start her recording career.

On December 18, 2005, Mirsad married then 19-year-old Dina Džanković, his girlfriend of the time of five months, and the 2005 Miss Serbia and Montenegro. They have three children together; two girls, Naba and Karia, and a boy, Nusret. The couple divorced in 2012. In 2015, Mirsad married Dušica Drljević, who gave birth to their son, Rejjan Mete, the same year.

Awards and accomplishments

Professional career
 5× Turkish Super Cup Winner: (1993, 1996, 1998, 2006, 2007)
 6× Turkish Cup Winner: (1994, 1996, 1997, 1998, 2010, 2011)
 8× Turkish Super League Champion: (1994, 1996, 1997, 2006, 2007, 2008, 2010, 2011)
 FIBA Korać Cup Champion: (1996)
 2× EuroLeague Final Four Participant: (2003, 2004)
 Russian League Champion: (2004)

Individual
 EuroLeague Regular Season MVP: (2002)
 EuroLeague Top 16 MVP: (2003)
 3× All-EuroLeague Team:
 All-EuroLeague First Team: (2004)
 2× All-EuroLeague Second Team: (2002–2003)
 5× Rebound leader of the EuroLeague: (2002, 2003, 2006, 2009, 2011)
 Rebound leader of the Italian League: (2003)
 Rebound leader of the Russian Super League: (2005)
 Number 6 jersey retired by Fenerbahçe: (2012)
 EuroLeague Legend: (2017)

Notes

References

External links

 Mirsad Türkcan at archive.fiba.com
 Mirsad Türkcan at fibaeurope.com
 Mirsad Türkcan at basketball-reference.com
 Mirsad Türkcan at euroleague.net
 Mirsad Türkcan at legabasket.it 
 Mirsad Türkcan at tblstat.net

1976 births
Living people
2002 FIBA World Championship players
Anadolu Efes S.K. players
BC Dynamo Moscow players
Bosniaks of Serbia
Fenerbahçe men's basketball players
Houston Rockets draft picks
Lega Basket Serie A players
Mens Sana Basket players
Milwaukee Bucks players
National Basketball Association players from Serbia
National Basketball Association players from Turkey
Naturalized citizens of Turkey
New York Knicks players
Paris Racing Basket players
PBC CSKA Moscow players
Power forwards (basketball)
Serbian emigrants to Turkey
Serbian expatriate basketball people in France
Serbian expatriate basketball people in Italy
Serbian expatriate basketball people in Russia
Serbian expatriate basketball people in the United States
Serbian men's basketball players
Small forwards
Sportspeople from Novi Pazar
Turkish expatriate sportspeople in France
Turkish expatriate sportspeople in Italy
Turkish expatriate sportspeople in Russia
Turkish expatriate basketball people in the United States
Turkish men's basketball players
Turkish people of Bosniak descent
Turkish people of Serbian descent
Ülker G.S.K. basketball players